Chestnut Hill Historic District is a national historic district located at Asheville, Buncombe County, North Carolina.  The district encompasses 238 contributing buildings and 1 contributing structure in a predominantly residential section of Asheville. It was developed in the late-19th and early-20th century and includes Colonial Revival, Queen Anne-influenced, and bracketed Victorian style dwellings.  At least eight of the houses were designed by architect Richard Sharp Smith.

It was listed on the National Register of Historic Places in 1983.

Gallery

References

Houses on the National Register of Historic Places in North Carolina
Historic districts on the National Register of Historic Places in North Carolina
Queen Anne architecture in North Carolina
Colonial Revival architecture in North Carolina
Buildings and structures in Asheville, North Carolina
National Register of Historic Places in Buncombe County, North Carolina
Houses in Buncombe County, North Carolina